Western Ojibwa (also known as , Saulteaux, and Plains Ojibwa) is a dialect of the Ojibwe language, a member of the Algonquian language family. It is spoken by the Saulteaux, a subnation of the Ojibwe people, in southern Manitoba and southern Saskatchewan, Canada, west of Lake Winnipeg.

Classification 
Genetically, Ojibwa is part of the Algonquian language family. This language family includes languages like Mi'kmaq, Abenaki, Malecite, Potawatomi, Delaware, Montagnais-Naskapi, Cree, and Blackfoot in Canada. In the U.S., are languages such as Menomini, Fox, Shawnee and Cheyenne. Yurok and Wiyot, also known as the Ritwan languages in old literature, that were once spoken in California are also relatives with Algonquian language family. Despite the geographic distance, these two languages make part of the Algic language family with the Algonquian languages.

Randolph Valentine (2000) divides Ojibwa into two major dialect groups: a southern group and a northern group. The southern dialect group includes Saulteaux in southern Manitoba and southern Saskatchewan; Ojibwa in most of Ontario, Manitoulin Island and Georgian Bay; Ottawa or Odawa in southern Ontario; and finally Chippewa in North Dakota, Minnesota, Wisconsin, and Michigan. The northern dialect group includes Oji-Cree in northern Ontario and Algonquin in Western Quebec.

Leonard Bloomfield (1946) was able to reconstruct the phonology system and some of the morphology of Proto-Algonquian through the comparison of cognates from four languages: Fox, Cree, Menomini, and Ojibwa.

Fig. 0.1 Proto-Algonquian Reconstructions made by Bloomfield (1946)

Fig. 0.2 Comparison of Central Ojibwa (Odawa), Western Ojibwa (Saulteaux), and Swampy Cree (2002)

History 

In comparison to other eastern tribes, the Ojibwa have suffered the least population loss at the time of European contact. With the number of their peoples and early acquisition of rifles, the Ojibwa were a powerful political force during the early period of the fur trade.

It was common for small groups to go onto the Plains to exploit the hunt and then return to the Woodland area. They would hunt moose, elk, and other forest game. As a result, they gradually advanced north and west from their Red River base, following the forest edge. The bison hunt also became incorporated into the cycle of seasonal exploitation for many of the Ojibwa family groups.

The small groups of Plains Ojibwa are called the Saulteaux. This name derives from French and refers to those that gathered around the falls – specifically the Sault Ste. Marie area of modern Ontario and Michigan. They defeated the Cheyenne in the 1700s and occupied southern Manitoba and southern Saskatchewan when the fur trade died out. They were entrenched as a plains Indian group with the signing of the Number Treaties in the 1870s.

Neither Western Ojibwa or any dialect of Ojibwa has official status in North America.

Geographic distribution 
The Ojibwa-speaking regions are found mainly to the south of Cree-speaking regions in Canada.

The exact number of current Saulteaux dialect speakers is unknown. However, there are several Saulteaux communities found in southern Manitoba and southern Saskatchewan.

Phonology 

Saulteaux has twenty-four phonemic segments – seventeen consonants and seven vowels.

Consonants 
The consonants are four resonants and thirteen obstruents. The resonant nasals are labial /m/ and alveolar /n/. The resonant glides are labio-velar  and palatal . Western Ojibwa has the glottal stop , not .

Fig. 1.1 Obstruents in Western Ojibwa

Vowels 
The vowels are divided into three short vowels and four long vowels.

Fig. 1.2 Short vowels in Western Ojibwa

Fig. 1.3 Long vowels in Western Ojibwa

N.B. – circumflexes/macrons over vowels mark length:  = .

Western Ojibwa is non-syncopating which means that weak vowels are not deleted according to metrical position.

Short vowels are treated different in the Ojibwa dialects. In Saulteaux, tensing does not occur with initial short vowels.

After a long vowel and before s or ʃ,  is not pronounced the same as elsewhere, instead the preceding vowel is given a nasalized sound.

Other phonological properties of Western Ojibwa 
As found on Valentine (1994):
This is marked by (t) in texts. For example,  'I work'.
 y-Epenthesis: a  can be inserted between two long vowels to maintain the phonotactic constraint that vowels do not occur next to each other in Saulteaux. This is marked by (y) in texts. Preroots ending in vowels that come before vowel-initial roots also receive this epenthesis. For example,  'we had it, we were there' and  '(s)he sits for a long time'.
 Glide elision: If a word that ends with a  has no suffixation, then the  will be elided. The glides (w,y) are optionally elided in many cases, especially in casual speech.
 Nasal assimilation: The nasals will assimilate to the following consonant of a cluster. So:
  →  / __p :  is realized as labial nasal [m] when it occurs before a labial stop 
  →  / __k :  is realized as velar nasal  when it occurs before a velar stop .
 (nk, ng) →  / __# :  is realized as  when it occurs at the end of the word.
  simplified to the velar nasal : this is scattered among the Saulteaux communities – in general it is a southern phenomenon and most prevalent in the southeast.
 ʃ > s: limited to Saulteaux, where the palatal and dental fricatives are common in some communities. This is not just a process of one sound assimilating to the other but both are heard. The occurrence of sibilants on the prairies is possibly coming from Plains Cree, which has only .
 s > ʃ: this feature is restricted to Saulteaux, probably under the influence of Plains Cree which has no .
This does not happen in Western Ojibwa.
 Nasal cluster simplification does not happen in this dialect.

Morphology 

Typologically, Saulteaux is an agglutinating or polysynthetic language which means that it relies heavily on affixation to express meaning. As is the case with languages that have active morphology, word order in this language is not as rigid as English.

Gender and animacy 
There is no distinction between masculine and feminine – instead there is a distinction between items that are animate and those that are inanimate. The animate category includes all human beings and animals, but in general not all other categories such as plants, body parts, utensils, etc. are fully under the animate category. A restricted set of items that are neither human nor animal are still considered animate – for example, rock, pipe, raspberries, pants, etc. Even across different Saulteaux dialects, 'strawberry' fluctuates in its animacy. This may be related to the practice of a "Strawberry Dance" by certain communities. The gender of an entity is important because for many morphemes, the language uses gender-specific morphology that distinguishes the animate from the inanimate.

Animate examples:

 'man'

 'mosquito'

 'sock'

 'raspberry'

Inanimate examples:

 'boat'

 'egg'

 'book'

 'strawberry'

Obviation 
This is a topic strategy for showing prominence between third persons within a discourse environment. Within a predication one animate third person will be the proximate and any other animate third persons will be obligatorily designated as the obviative.

The suffix  is the obviative marker:

 'The dog sees a cat'

 'The cat sees a dog'

Ojibwa verbs also mark whether the action is direct or inverse. In the first two examples the action takes place directly, where the proximate is acting upon the obviative. This direction can be inverted  meaning that the verb marks when the obviative is acting on the proximate by using the inverse morpheme :

 'The dog is seen by the cat'

So the  morpheme is something entirely different from an accusative marker.

Person hierarchy 
There is also a person hierarchy, as a result, showing the "preferred" person to use in Saulteaux discourse is the second person, followed by the first person, and finally the third person. The third person can show the proximate (the unmarked category), the obviative, the highly marked further obviative that is reserved for non-prominent third persons acting or being acted upon by the obviative.

Other morphological properties of Western Ojibwa  
As found on Valentine (1994):
 The suffix  is used as a locative
 : most Ojibwa dialects form the diminutive by adding the suffix –Vns where V, the vowel, is realized as  unless attached to a noun stem ending with a glide. When there is a glide, like j or w, the suffix takes on the backness and rounding features of the glide. For example, 'small boat' (stem ), 'small tree',  'small net' (stem ).
 Saulteaux Ojibwa does not have a suffix for inanimate obviative
 Inanimate plural suffix is realized as 
 There are a number of Saulteaux communities that use the suffix  while others use the suffix  for obviative possessor of animate
 For animate obviative plural, many communities do not distinguish between singular and plural in the animate obviative.
 There is no final  in nouns with a Cy stem
 The demonstrative for animate singular proximal  is used. The reduced form  is much more common.
 First person plural exclusive 'we' is 
  is indefinite inanimate singular 'something'.
  is the animate singular interrogative pronoun 'who' used by the Manitoba Saulteaux speakers while  is used by the extreme west of Saulteaux.
  is the interrogative particle 'when'.
  is the interrogative particle 'where'.
  is the interrogative particle 'how'.
  seems to be outstripping  as the voluntative preverb within the Saulteaux communities, especially speakers surveyed west of central Manitoba.
 A number of western Saulteaux communities use  as a negative past preverb. This is found common in areas adjacent to or bilingual with Cree, which uses the cognate .
 Northern Manitoba Saulteaux have  as a complementizer preverb while communities in the south have .

Syntax 
Saulteaux is a non-configurational language which means that it has free word order. A fully inflected verb constitutes a sentence or clause on its own with the subject, object, aspect and other notions expressed through the verbal morphology. The language dialect uses pronominals to express the arguments of the verb and any overt nouns (or determiner phrases (DPs)) that further refer to these entities are just adjuncts of the verb. The overt DPs are actually not necessary as they just repeat information and relationships already marked on the verb. As a result, the occurrence of DPs referring to the arguments of verbs is optional and often left out.

 – 'Joe ((s)he like her/him) Mary'

The thematic information is applied verb-internally and not at the sentence level and so the affixes and clitics are arguments. The verb  by itself already shows that someone likes another person. The verb is from the third person set of the VTA (transitive animate verb) order and is inflected for a direct action. We can see that the proximate is acting on the obviative as Joe is not marked and Mary is marked with the obviative marker .

Saulteaux's word order, however, would be better described as VO(S) to show the rare appearance of an overt subject, but that it does occur finally most often when it does appear.

Writing system 
The language is written using the Standard Roman Orthography (SRO). Some people use double vowels to represent long vowels while others lengthen the vowels by adding either a macron accent  or acute accent.

Common phrases

Notable researchers 
Some notable researchers who documented the Ojibwa dialect are:
 Margaret Cote-Lerat
 Terry J. Klokeid
 Harold J. Logan
 James H. Howard
 Paul Voorhis
 J. Randolph Valentine

Notes

See also 
 Algonquian languages
 Ojibwe language
 Ojibwe dialects

References 
 Cote, Margaret. 1984. Nahkawēwin: Saulteaux (Ojibway dialect of the Plains). Regina SK: Saskatchewan Indian Federated College.
 Cote, Margaret and Terry J. Klokeid. 1985. Saulteaux verb book. Regina, SK: Saskatchewan Indian Federated College.
 Logan, Harold J.. 2001. A Collection of Saulteaux Texts with Translations and Linguistic Analyses. MA Thesis, University of Regina.
 [Scott, Mary Ellen et al.] 1995. The Saulteaux Language Dictionary. Kinistin First Nation and Duval House Publishing. 
 Valentine, J. Randolph. 1994. Ojibwe dialect relationships. PhD dissertation, University of Texas, Austin.
 Voorhis, Paul. 1976. A Saulteaux (Ojibwe) phrase book based on the dialects of Manitoba. Brandon, MB: Department of Native Studies, Brandon University.

External links 
 Our Languages: Nakawē (Saskatchewan Indian Cultural Centre)
OLAC resources in and about the Western Ojibwa language

Ojibwe culture
Central Algonquian languages
Ojibwa language, Eastern
Indigenous languages of the North American Plains
First Nations languages in Canada
Culture of Manitoba
Culture of Saskatchewan